The 2013 Isle of Man TT  Races were held between the Saturday 25 May and Friday 7 June 2013 on the 37.73-mile Isle of Man TT Mountain Course in the Isle of Man.  The event celebrated the 90th anniversary of the first Sidecar TT with a special parade lap for racing sidecar outfits. The 2013 Isle of Man TT Festival also included the Pre-TT Classic Races on 24, 25 & 27 May 2013 and the Post-TT Races on 8 June 2013 and both events held on the Billown Circuit.

The Blue Riband event of race meeting the Senior TT race was won by John McGuinness and raising his tally of victories to 20 Isle of Man TT wins and also breaking the outright course record in the Superbike TT with a lap at an average speed of 131.671.  The event was dominated by Michael Dunlop winning the Superbike TT race, Supersport TT Races 1 & 2, the Superstock TT and the Joey Dunlop TT Championship with 120 points from John McGuinness and Bruce Anstey in third place.  The Sidecar TT race produced a maiden Isle of Man TT wins for the two former Sidecar World Champions with Tim Reeves / Dan Sayle winning Sidecar TT Race 1 and Ben Birchall / Tim Birchall winning Sidecar TT Race 2.  The Lightweight TT for 650cc twin-cylinder motor-cycles produced another maiden win for James Hillier and Michael Rutter scored a hattrick or wins in the TT Zero class for electric powered motor-cycles after winning for the third consecutive year.

The Senior TT race  was red-flagged on the first lap after Isle of Man TT newcomer Jonathan Howarth crashed at the bottom of Bray Hill and 10 spectators were injured in the incident.

News was also made when James May completed a lap on a sidecar outfit built entirely from meccano. This was televised as part of his Toy Stories series.

Practice Week
The first part of practice week was dominated by inclement weather with Monday and the Wednesday evening practice run as untimed sessions.  The Tuesday session cancelled due to heavy rain showers and the Friday evening was session red-flagged for 50 minutes for the Isle of Man Fire Service to attend a house fire in Kirk Michael village.  To provide sufficient practice for competitors the first part of Saturday race day was run as an extended practice session.  The first race of the 2013 Isle of Man TT races was the rescheduled Sidecar TT Race 1 and the Superbike TT held over to next day and run on Sunday afternoon for the first time since 2005.

The Japanese competitor Yoshinari Matsushita crashed fatally at Ballacrye Corner near Ballaugh during the Monday evening practice causing the session to be abandoned.

TT Race Week 2013

Practice Times

Practice Times & Leaderboard Superbike/Senior TT

Plates; Black on White/Black on Yellow.

Practice Times & Leaderboard Superstock TT

Plates; Red.

Practice Times & Leaderboard Supersport Junior TT

Plates; Blue.

Practice Times and Leaderboard 600cc Sidecar TT

Race Results

2013 Sidecar TT Race 1 TT final standings

1 June 2013 3 Laps (113.00 Miles) TT Mountain Course.

Fastest Lap: Tim Reeves/Daniel Sayle – 114.608 mph (19' 45.158 ) on lap 2.

2013 Superbike TT final standings.

2 June 2013 6 Laps (236.38 Miles) TT Mountain Course.

Fastest Lap and New Overall Course Record: John McGuinness – 131.671 mph (17' 11.572) on lap 6.

2013 Supersport Junior TT Race 1

3 June 2013 4 Laps (150.73 Miles) TT Mountain Course.

Fastest Lap: Michael Dunlop – 127.525 mph (17' 45.111) on lap 2.

2013 Superstock TT Race final standings.

3 June 2013 4 Laps (150.73 Miles) TT Mountain Course.

Fastest Lap: Michael Dunlop – 131.220 mph (17' 15.114) on lap 4.

2013 TT Zero Race

5 June 2013 1 Lap (37.73 Miles) TT Mountain Course.

 (10 Starters)

Fastest Lap and New Race Record: Michael Rutter – 109.675 mph (20' 38.461) on lap 1.

2013 Supersport Junior TT Race 2

5 June 2013 4 Laps (150.73 Miles) TT Mountain Course.

Fastest Lap: Michael Dunlop – 128.667 mph (17' 35.659) on lap 2.

2013 Sidecar TT Race 2 TT final standings

5 June 2013 3 Laps (113.00 Miles) TT Mountain Course.

Fastest Lap: Ben Birchall / Tom Birchall – 114.662 mph (19' 44.598 ) on lap 2.

2013 Lightweight TT 650cc Super-Twin

7 June 2013 3 Laps (113.00 Miles) TT Mountain Course

Fastest Lap: James Hillier – 115.554 mph (19' 00.168) on lap 3.

2013 Senior TT final standings.

7 June 2013 6 Laps (236.38 Miles) TT Mountain Course.

Fastest Lap: Bruce Anstey – 131.531 mph (17' 12.671) on lap 6.

See also
Manx Grand Prix
North West 200
Ulster Grand Prix

Gallery

Sources

External links

 2013 Isle of Man TT Races Circuit Guide

Isle of Man TT
2013 in British motorsport
2013
2013 in motorcycle sport